Ken Garraway is a former Canadian soccer player.

Club career
Garraway played his youth soccer with the Lakehill Soccer Association in Victoria, British Columbia. Garraway played the summer of 1985 with the Victoria Riptides in the Western Soccer Alliance Challenge Cup.

International career
Garraway played 22 'A' internationals for the Canadian national soccer team.

A forward, Garraway was a regular in the Canadian line-up from 1983 to 1985. Despite his 22 appearances however, he failed to score any national team goals.

Garraway was also a member of the Canadian Olympic team that reached the quarter-finals of the 1984 Los Angeles Olympics, playing in 8 qualifying games. He scored once in qualifying in a 1–2 away loss to Mexico.

He appeared in the final qualifier versus Honduras which clinched qualification for the 1986 World Cup as a substitute for Ian Bridge, but was not in the squad in Mexico.

Post-retirement
Garraway has been a long-time youth soccer coach in Campbell River, British Columbia. He was head coach of the British Columbia Soccer Association's Provincial Under-15 girls team in 2005–6.

Ken is also a coach with BC Soccer, and he has won a gold, and silver at the BMO National Championships. Most recently in 2009, he won silver in the U-14 division. By his players he is mentioned as one of the greatest coaches they have had. He can bring a team together in a special not tangible way.

References

External links
www.lakehillsoccer.com

a-leaguearchive.tripod.com
www.canadasoccer.com/nationals/olympic

Year of birth missing (living people)
Living people
Canada men's international soccer players
Canadian soccer players
Canadian people of Scottish descent
Association football forwards
People from Campbell River, British Columbia
Soccer players from Victoria, British Columbia
Victoria Riptides players
Western Soccer Alliance players
Place of birth missing (living people)
Olympic soccer players of Canada
Footballers at the 1984 Summer Olympics
CONCACAF Championship-winning players